Mary Finsterer (born 25 August 1962) is an Australian composer and academic.

Life
Finsterer was born in Canberra in 1962; her siblings are the actors Anni Finsterer and Jack Finsterer. She graduated in 1987 with a Bachelor of Music degree from the University of Melbourne. A recipient of the Royal Netherlands Government Award in 1993, she continued her studies in Amsterdam with Louis Andriessen, then returned to Australia and studied with Brenton Broadstock, completing a Master of Music degree in 1995 at the University of Melbourne. She completed a Doctor of Philosophy degree in 2003. In 2006 she received a Churchill Fellowship for her continuing work in multimedia. Finsterer is married to the photographer Dean Golja.

Since 2007 Finsterer has completed a body of work that includes In Praise of Darkness, a major orchestral work for the Dutch ensemble ASKO│Schönberg in association with Tura Music, a violin duo for soloists Natsuko Yoshimoto and James Cuddeford, a string quartet for the Goldner String Quartet, a chamber work for the Sydney Soloists, and a number of works for her 2009 composer-in-residence position at the Campbelltown Performing Arts Centre.

Her orchestral fanfare Afmaeli was the opening piece for the 70th birthday celebrations of composer Louis Andriessen at the Holland Festival in 2009. In the same year Finsterer was the winner of the Paul Lowin Orchestral Prize for her new work In Praise of Darkness.

Finsterer has taught music and composition at Duquesne University in Pittsburgh, the University of Montreal in Canada, the University of Wollongong, the Victorian College of the Arts, the Sydney Conservatorium of Music, the University of Sydney and the Australian Film, Television and Radio School where she became an honorary research fellow in 2009. Finsterer is a Vice-Chancellor's Professorial Fellow at Monash University and in July 2014 she was announced as the inaugural Chamber Music Australia Chair of Composition at Monash University to teach there until 2017. She currently teaches as University of Tasmania whilst working on a new opera. Her works have been performed internationally.

Finsterer has composed for films and electroacoustic events for the Music Biennale Zagreb, Nouvel Ensemble Moderne, Ensemble intercontemporain, and Ictus Ensemble for performances in Lille and Brussels. She worked as an orchestrator on the 2007 film Die Hard 4.0. Her film music for the 2010 feature film South Solitary received a Film Critics Circle of Australia nomination in 2010, and has since been released on the CD label ABC Classics.

Her first opera, Biographica, to a libretto by Tom Wright, about the life of Gerolamo Cardano, premiered in January 2017 at the Sydney Festival with the Sydney Chamber Opera at the Carriageworks. Her second opera, Antarctica, also to a libretto by Wright, was first performed at Muziekgebouw aan 't IJ in Amsterdam for the Holland Festival 2022 in a co-production with Sydney Chamber Opera.

Honors and awards
"Let's Celebrate Oz Music" ABC Award 1989
Albert H. Maggs Composition Award 1990 for Catch
Le Nouvel Ensemble Moderne's Forum 91
Paris Rostrum Prize, 1992
Music Lives!, Pittsburgh, 1992
Composer-in-residence with Sydney Symphony Orchestra, 1992
Royal Netherlands Government Award 1993
Australia Council Composer Fellowship, 1998
Churchill Fellowship 2006 for work in the film industry
Paul Lowin Orchestral Prize 2009 for In Praise of Darkness
APRA|AMCOS Art Music Award for Vocal Work 2018 for Biographica

Works
Selected works include:

 Ruisselant (1991)
 Catch (1992)
 Nextwave Fanfare (1992)
 Omaggio Alla Pieta (1992)
 Tract, for cello (1993)
 Constans (1995)
 Nyx (1996)
 Ether (1998)
 Achos (1999)
 Kurz (2000)
 Pascal's Sphere (2000)
 Sequi (2001)
 Sleep (2002)
 Afmaeli (2009)
 In Praise of Darkness (2009)
 Ionia (2009)
 South Solitary (2010), film score (released on CD South Solitary by ABC Classics)
 Antea (2012)
 Falling (2012)
 Silva (2012)
 Aerea (2013)
 Lake Ice: Missed Tales No. 1 (2013) for double bass and orchestra
 Biographica (2017), opera
 Antarctica (2022), opera

References

Further reading 
 Barkl, Michael. 2001. "Finsterer, Mary". The New Grove Dictionary of Music and Musicians, second edition, edited by Stanley Sadie and John Tyrrell. London: Macmillan.

External links

1962 births
Living people
20th-century classical composers
APRA Award winners
Australian film score composers
Australian music educators
Australian women classical composers
Australian women film score composers
People from Canberra
University of Melbourne alumni
Winners of the Albert H. Maggs Composition Award
Women music educators
20th-century women composers